Thomas Kinkade's Christmas Cottage is a 2008 Christmas biopic directed by Michael Campus, the first film he had directed in more than 30 years. It stars Jared Padalecki as painter Thomas Kinkade and features Peter O'Toole, Marcia Gay Harden and Aaron Ashmore.

The film was originally intended for release theatrically in 2007, but due to final edits and music rights its release was delayed until the following year. The film's official painting was created throughout 2007, alongside the film's production. The film was eventually released direct to video in the United States on November 11, 2008.

Cast
Jared Padalecki as Thomas Kinkade
Aaron Ashmore as Pat Kinkade, Thomas’s brother
Marcia Gay Harden as MaryAnne Kinkade, Thomas’s mother
Richard Burgi as Bill Kinkade
Peter O'Toole as Glen Wesman based on Glenn Wessels
Kiersten Warren as Tanya Kapinski, Miss Placerville (1974)
Gina Holden as Hope Eastbrook
Chris Elliott as Ernie Trevor
Tegan Moss as Nanette
Chelan Simmons as Miss Placerville (1977)
Jay Brazeau as Mr. Rosa
Geoffrey Lewis as Butch Conran
Malcolm Stewart as Lloyd Gunderson
Gabrielle Rose as Evelyn Gunderson
Richard Moll as Big Jim
Charlotte Rae as Vesta Furniss
Chang Tseng as Mr. Chang
Nancy Robertson as Deputy Hornbuckle
Edward Asner as Sidney

See also 
 List of Christmas films

References

External links

2008 biographical drama films
2000s Christmas films
2008 drama films
2008 films
American biographical drama films
American Christmas films
Biographical films about painters
Cultural depictions of 20th-century painters
Cultural depictions of American men
Films directed by Michael Campus
Films scored by Aaron Zigman
Films set in the 1970s
Films shot in Vancouver
2000s English-language films
2000s American films